The  Simmersberg is a mountain,  near Schnett in the municipality of Masserberg) in the county of Hildburghausen in Germany. It is the main summit of a forked mountain chain, which runs along the boundary between the Thuringian Forest and the Thuringian Highland from Masserberg towards the southwest and is bounded by the valleys of the Schleuse (in the northwest) and its tributary, the Biber (in the south).

Other subpeaks of the ridge are the Hohe Warth (718 m) in the west, the Kohlberg (718 m) in the southwest, the Schnetter Berg (757 m) in the north and the Höheberg (780 m) in the northeast. The volcanic origins within the otherwise non-volcanic mountain ridge can be recognised especially well near the Simmersberg and its two 718 metre-high pre-summits.

The 740-metre-high Holzberg, which is 2 km northeast and adjacent to the Schnetter Berg and north of the Höheberg, separated by a deep valley from the Simmersberg peaks, must be considered as an independent mountain.

Views 
Because the summit of the Simmersberg, on which there used to be an inn, but now has a youth hostel, is largely treeless, the mountain has an extensive view in all directions without the need for climbing a tower.
In good visibility the outline of the Rhön in the west may be seen as well as the less high Haßberge hills to the south.

Still clearly outside the Thuringian Forest, but somewhat closer is the Dolmar near Meiningen (740 m) over 30 km away to the west, and the Gleichberge (642 and 679 m)  to the southwest, 25 km distant – all three are clearly of volcanic origin.
To the left and east of them are the ruins of Straufhain Castle (449 m) and Coburg Fortress (464 m).

North (right) of the Dolmar in clear weather can be seen the Pleß (645 m), 52 km away to the northwest and, in the extreme northeast the Anterior Rhön can be made out.
Immediately right of that and about 14 to 20 km distant – and visible in even moderately good conditions – are the highest points of the Thuringian Forest:

In the east lies the nearby Rennsteigwarte watchtower on the Eselsberg (841.5 m) near Masserberg, to the southeast just 3 km away, but separated by the deep valley of the Biber, is the mining village of Waffenrod/Hinterrod with the mountains of Klingeberg (677.2 m), Eckartsberg (760.4 m) and Grendel (787.2 m).

See also 
List of mountains and hills in Thuringia

References

Mountains under 1000 metres
Volcanoes of Germany
Mountains of Thuringia
Hildburghausen (district)